Bijan Ebrahimi was an Iranian refugee living in Bristol, United Kingdom. For seven years, the 44-year old disabled man had reported death threats and racial abuse from his neighbours.

On 14 July 2013, Ebrahimi was murdered by his neighbour, Lee James. James had falsely accused Ebrahimi of being a paedophile (when in fact he had merely been recording evidence of threats and antisocial behaviour, since the police had dismissed them) and then beat Ebrahimi to death, later dragging Ebrahimi's body to his home's front yard and setting fire to it.

Considered a case of institutional racism, the case drew international media attention. An independent review concluded that Bristol City Council and the police were guilty of institutional racism in dealings with Bijan Ebrahimi. Four police and community officers were fired and two were jailed.

Events 
Bristol resident and Iranian refugee Bijan Ebrahimi complained that he was being frequently harassed by some of his neighbours. To provide evidence, he began filming them. While filming his neighbour Lee James drinking beer and playing with his young daughter, James noticed Ebrahimi filming them, and accused him of filming his daughter for his sexual gratification. James subsequently attacked Ebrahimi, and told his neighbours that he believed Ebrahimi to be a paedophile.

Ebrahimi called the police who arrived to find a homicidally enraged James, but decided to instead arrest Ebrahimi because they found him difficult. While being led away under arrest, an angry crowd which had gathered outside Ebrahimi's house cheered the policemen on because they believed that Ebrahimi had been arrested for paedophilia. After being arrested, the officers treated Ebrahimi's concerns for his own safety with open contempt before housing him a few miles from his previous home.

James found out about Ebrahimi's new home and began trying to murder him. Ebrahimi made many attempts to contact the police, but the police chose to ignore his pleas. While Ebrahimi was trying to flee, he was intercepted by James, who beat him to death. A neighbour of James provided alcohol to help burn Ebrahimi's body. When the police arrived, Ebrahimi's body was still burning.

References 

2013 murders in the United Kingdom
2010s in Bristol
Deaths by person in England
False allegations of sex crimes
July 2013 crimes in Europe
July 2013 events in the United Kingdom
Murder in Bristol
Racism in England